Airglades Airport  is a county-owned public-use airport in Hendry County, Florida, United States.

Overview
The airport has a lighted 5950-foot runway (13-31) and ample aircraft tie-down space, Avfuel® aviation and jet fuel, and repair facilities for visiting aircraft and locally based aircraft owners. Unicom is on 123.05. Rental are available, as well as a local taxi service for easy travel around the area.

History
In 1941, British Prime Minister Winston Churchill made an urgent appeal to the United States to provide war materials and pilot training for defense against a superior German air power which bombarded England during the Battle of Britain. President Franklin Roosevelt responded by implementing the Lend Lease Act, which called for the construction of six British Flying Training Schools in California, Arizona, Oklahoma, Texas and the British Flying Training School (BFTS) #5 at Riddle Field near the town of Clewiston, Florida, which trained more than 1,700 cadets in the Royal Air Force.

The airfield was opened on 12 November 1942 by the United States Army Air Forces. Assigned to USAAF Southeast Training Center (later Southeast Flying Training Command). It conducted contract basic flying training by Riddle-McKay Aero College (which was at the time one of six divisions of the Embry-Riddle School of Aviation), under the jurisdiction of the 75th Flying Training Detachment (Contract Pilot School)

Daily life at Riddle Field consisted of Primary flight training in the Stearman PT-17, Basic flying training in the Vultee BT-13, through to completion of the Advanced flying course in the Harvard AT-6. The cadets also received extensive training in formation flying, acrobatic maneuvers, armaments and instrument navigation.  More than 1,300 cadets earned their wings at Riddle Field and returned to England to face their two greatest enemies, the Nazis, and the weather.

Local volunteers established a Cadet Club in what was known as the Pioneer Building (on Ponce deLeon Street behind present day U.S. Sugar Corp.) where dances and games were provided. The Clewiston Inn also served as a meeting place for officers and cadets to socialize.

Inactivated 31 December 1945 with the drawdown of AAFTC's pilot training program and was declared surplus in 1946. Responsibility for it was given to the War Assets Administration (WAA) and the facility was eventually acquired by Hendry County.

The present-day Airglades Airport was built after the war over the runways of Riddle Field.  The buildings of the wartime field have been replaced by modern buildings, however the airfield is partially still in use.  The No. 5 BFTS Association of former students continue their contact with the Clewiston community through periodic visits.

See also

 Florida World War II Army Airfields
 28th Flying Training Wing (World War II)

References

 Manning, Thomas A. (2005), History of Air Education and Training Command, 1942–2002.  Office of History and Research, Headquarters, AETC, Randolph AFB, Texas 
 Shaw, Frederick J. (2004), Locating Air Force Base Sites, History’s Legacy, Air Force History and Museums Program, United States Air Force, Washington DC.

External links
 

1942 establishments in Florida
Airports established in 1942
Airports in Florida
Transportation buildings and structures in Hendry County, Florida
Airfields of the United States Army Air Forces in Florida
USAAF Contract Flying School Airfields
Closed installations of the United States Army